The Burra and Clare was an electoral district of the House of Assembly in the Australian state of South Australia from 1857 to 1862.

The Burra and Clare was also the name of an electoral district of the unicameral South Australian Legislative Council from 1851 until its abolition in 1857, George Strickland Kingston being the member.

In November 1862 The Burra and Clare was an abolished and superseded by the Electoral district of The Burra, John Bentham Neales and George William Cole being the last members for the old district and the first members for the new.

The town of Burra is currently located in the safe Liberal seat of Stuart while the town of Clare is currently located in the independent seat of Frome.

Members

References 

Former electoral districts of South Australia
1857 establishments in Australia
1862 disestablishments in Australia